"Backflip" is the second single by American singer-actress Raven-Symoné from her third album, This Is My Time. It debuted on Radio Disney on July 28, 2004.

Music video
The music video was filmed in Los Angeles and directed by Sanaa Hamri, premiered on BET's Access Granted on August 25, 2004. The video received heavy rotation on Disney Channel, BET and MTV. Michael Copon plays in the video as Raven's love interest.

Track listing
"Backflip" - 3:53
"Backflip" (Call Out Hook) – 0:31

Live performance
Symoné performed the song live for the first time in Macy's Thanksgiving Day Parade on November 25, 2004. Symoné performed the song on tours, This Is My Time Tour and Raven-Symoné: Live in Concert Tour.

References

2004 songs
Raven-Symoné songs